Bolshevik is a rural locality (a settlement) and the administrative center of Bolshevistskoye Rural Settlement, Yelansky District, Volgograd Oblast, Russia. The population was 809 as of 2010. There are 8 streets.

Geography 
Bolshevik is located on Khopyorsko-Buzulukskaya Plain, on the right bank of the Buzuluk River, 55 km south of Yelan (the district's administrative centre) by road. Bulgurino is the nearest rural locality.

References 

Rural localities in Yelansky District